Stéphane Hamidou Doukouré (22 May 1974 – 12 October 2006), known professionally as "Douk Saga", was an Ivorian singer and the creator of Coupé-décalé music style alongside a dancing step. He popularized the music genre all over Africa and Europe, his most popular song in early 2000's was "Sagacité".

Biography
Douk Saga was (born 22 May 1974)  at Yamoussoukro, Côte d'Ivoire, died on October 12, 2006, in Ouagadougou, Burkina Faso

Music career

Douk Saga's musical style and dancing steps remained history in Europe  and Africa. He was the creator of Coupé-décalé music style, popularized with its own dancing step, involving hand gests like "Afuka Fuka" and also had a flamboyant lifestyle. In 2000's during Abidjan political crisis, Douk Saga's music was used to substitute war in Abidjan cum "Coupe" means (cut-off), the music genre had been widely received worldwide by music lovers.

See also
 Coupé-décalé

References

20th-century Ivorian male singers
1974 births
2006 deaths